Leo Hebraeus may refer to:

 Judah Leon Abravanel
 Gersonides